Harry Lawson may refer to:

Harry John Lawson (1852–1925), British bicycle designer, cyclist, motor industry pioneer and fraudster
Harry Levy-Lawson, 1st Viscount Burnham (1862–1933)
Sir Harry Lawson (politician) (1875–1952), Australian politician
Harry Lawson (runner) (1882–?), British-born Canadian marathon runner
Harry Lawson (legal scholar) (1897–1983), British legal scholar

See also
Henry Lawson (disambiguation)
Harold Andrew Balvaird Lawson (1899–1985), Scottish officer of arms
Harold Lawson (1937–2019), American software engineer, computer architect and systems engineer